The , referred to as the , is an assault rifle developed for the Japan Ground Self-Defense Force by Howa. The first examples were purchased in 2019, and it is intended to eventually replace the Howa Type 89 in general service.

Development
In August 2014, it was reported that the JGSDF was looking for a new rifle to replace the Type 89. Initial candidates to replace the Type 89s include the Heckler & Koch G36, Heckler & Koch HK416, Steyr AUG, FN SCAR, and a new rifle developed by Howa.

In 2015, the Japanese Ministry of Defense procured various foreign made rifles for testing purposes and contracted with Howa to test their domestic rifle. The procurement contract is shown as:

The small arms "S type, 516 and 716" are the SIG516 and SIG716, "G type, V" is the G36V, "HK type" is likely the HK416 or HK417, and "SC type, H and L" is the SCAR-H and SCAR-L. It is unknown what rifle is small arms "M type".

At the same time, Howa filed a patent on the design for their rifle on 15 May 2015. Furthermore, the design was patented under Japan's Design Act (Article 14) which allows the design to be kept in secret for up to three years. An updated design was later patented under the same law on 25 September 2015.

In 2018, the Ministry of Defense procured another batch of small arms for testing. The procurement contract is shown as:

The rifles were later revealed to be the Type 20 (then designated as HOWA 5.56), HK416 and SCAR-L following an announcement on 6 December 2019 that the Type 20 has been selected over the other two rifles. A follow up report stated that two evaluations were conducted on the rifle in 2018. The first evaluation focused on the weapon's performance on land such as effective range and accuracy. The second evaluation compared the weapon's performance, logistics and cost to the other two rifles. 

Since all three rifles satisfied the JGSDF's requirements, the Type 20 was selected due to having the highest score based on the second evaluation. The unit price for mass production is stated to be at ¥280,000 including maintenance and operation costs. The estimated life cycle cost is ¥43.9 billion if 150,000 units are procured.

The first batch of rifles (3,283 units) were purchased for ¥900 million in the FY 2020 defense budget, equivalent to $2,600 per rifle.

History
On May 18 2020, the Ministry of Defense announced that the rifle would be designated as the Type 20. It was also announced that the Type 20 will first be issued to soldiers in the Amphibious Rapid Deployment Brigade.

Design
The Type 20 is said to possess better environment durability, fire power and extensibility over the Type 89. This is needed as water-resistance is essential for amphibious operations in the southwestern islands of Japan. One key difference it has over the Type 89 is the addition of multiple rails, making it the first Japanese rifle to have this feature as a standard design. The magazine is also believed to be STANAG compatible. The rifle features a telescoping stock, vertical forward grip, an ambidextrous safety selector, and operates via short-stroke piston. Compared to its original design, the current design of the Type 20 retains much of the same characteristics with only some notable changes. The barrel length has been shortened slightly and the hand guard has been redesigned to feature an M-LOK rail design. The side rails have been extended, foldable iron sights were added and the stock features a shoulder pad similar to the one seen on the HK416.  

Because of the radical and modern design shift the rifle has over its predecessor, there are some speculations on how it got its design. One speculation is that the design was possibly influenced by various foreign made rifles; as Japan has experience procuring and utilizing a number of foreign rifles, i.e. the Special Forces Group. As such, the design of the Type 20 has been compared to the FN SCAR, CZ 805 BREN and Heckler & Koch HK433; with some observers believing the rifle possesses similar dimensions and functionality to the SCAR. Another design influence is speculated to come from the experience Howa has gained from developing the ACIES variants of the Type 89.

The rifle weighs 3.5 kg and has a total length between 780 mm to 850 mm depending on the extension of the stock. The barrel length is 330 mm. Unlike the Type 89, the Type 20 did not adopt the three round burst select fire, as it was deemed unnecessary. The rifle is compatible with an underbarrel bayonet, and, according to a Ministry of Defense press conference, the rifle can be used with the Beretta GLX-160 grenade launcher. The rifle was also showcased with a foregrip that features a miniature bipod and a DEON MARCH 8x optical sight.

Users
 : In December 2019, the Japan Self-Defense Forces selected the Type 20 as a replacement for their earlier Howa Type 89, winning over the Heckler & Koch HK416 and FN SCAR. 3,283 rifles were purchased in 2020, for $9 million.

See also
 AK-12
 EF88 Austeyr
 M27 IAR
 QBZ-191

References

External Links
 Official website (in Japanese)

Rifles of Japan
Weapons and ammunition introduced in 2020
5.56 mm assault rifles
Post–Cold War weapons of Japan